The Polar Satellite Launch Vehicle (PSLV) is an expendable medium-lift launch vehicle designed and operated by the Indian Space Research Organisation (ISRO). It was developed to allow India to launch its Indian Remote Sensing (IRS) satellites into sun-synchronous orbits, a service that was, until the advent of the PSLV in 1993, only commercially available from Russia. PSLV can also launch small size satellites into Geostationary Transfer Orbit (GTO).

Some notable payloads launched by PSLV include India's first lunar probe Chandrayaan-1, India's first interplanetary mission, Mars Orbiter Mission (Mangalyaan) and India's first space observatory, Astrosat.

PSLV has gained credibility as a leading provider of rideshare services for small satellites, owing to its numerous multi-satellite deployment campaigns with auxiliary payloads, usually ride-sharing along with an Indian primary payload. As of June 2022, PSLV has launched 345 foreign satellites from 36 countries. Most notable among these was the launch of PSLV-C37 on 15 February 2017, successfully deploying 104 satellites in sun-synchronous orbit, tripling the previous record held by Russia for the highest number of satellites sent to space on a single launch, until 24 January 2021, when SpaceX launched the Transporter-1 mission on a Falcon 9 rocket carrying 143 satellites into orbit.

Payloads can be integrated in tandem configuration employing a Dual Launch Adapter. Smaller payloads are also placed on equipment deck and customized payload adapters.

Development 

Studies by the PSLV Planning group under S Srinivasan to develop a vehicle capable of delivering a 600 kg payload to a 550 km sun-synchronous orbit from SHAR began in 1978. Among 35 proposed configurations, four were picked; by November 1980, a vehicle configuration with two strap-ons on a core booster (S80) with 80 tonne solid propellant loading each, a liquid stage with 30 tonne propellant load (L30), and an upper stage called the Perigee-Apogee System (PAS) was being considered.

By 1981, confidence grew in remote sensing spacecraft development with the launch of Bhaskara-1, and the PSLV project objectives were upgraded to have the vehicle deliver a 1000 kg payload into a 900 km SSO. As technology transfer of Viking rocket engine firmed up, a new lighter configuration with the inclusion of a liquid powered stage was selected. Funding was approved in July 1982 for the finalized design, employing a single large S125 solid core as first stage with six 9 tonne strap-ons (S9) derived from the SLV-3 first stage, liquid fueled second stage (L33), and two solid upper stages (S7 and S2.) This configuration needed further improvement to meet the orbital injection accuracy requirements of IRS satellites, and hence, the solid terminal stage (S2) was replaced with a pressure fed liquid fueled stage (L1.8 or LUS) powered by twin engines derived from roll control engines of the first stage. Apart from increasing precision, liquid upper stage also absorbed any deviation in performance of solid third stage. The final configuration of PSLV-D1 to fly in 1993 was (6 × S9 + S125) + L37.5 + S7 + L2.

The inertial navigation systems are developed by ISRO Inertial Systems Unit (IISU) at Thiruvananthapuram. The liquid propulsion for the second and fourth stages of the PSLV as well as the Reaction control systems (RCS) are developed by the Liquid Propulsion Systems Centre (LPSC) at Valiamala near Thiruvananthapuram, kerala. The solid propellant motors are processed at Satish Dhawan Space Centre (SHAR) at Sriharikota, Andhra Pradesh, which also carries out launch operations.

The PSLV was first launched on 20 September 1993. The first and second stages performed as expected, but an attitude control problem led to the collision of the second and third stages at separation, and the payload failed to reach orbit. After this initial setback, the PSLV successfully completed its second mission in 1994. The fourth launch of PSLV suffered a partial failure in 1997, leaving its payload in a lower than planned orbit. In November 2014, the PSLV had launched 34 times with no further failures. (Although launch 41: August 2017 PSLV-C39 was unsuccessful.)

PSLV continues to support Indian and foreign satellite launches especially for low Earth orbit (LEO) satellites. It has undergone several improvements with each subsequent version, especially those involving thrust, efficiency as well as weight. In November 2013, it was used to launch the Mars Orbiter Mission, India's first interplanetary probe.

In June 2018, the Union Cabinet approved  for 30 operational flights of the PSLV scheduled to take place between 2019 and 2024.

ISRO is working towards handing over the production and operation of PSLV to private industry through a joint venture. On 16 August 2019, NewSpace India Limited issued an invitation to tender for manufacturing PSLV entirely by private industries. On 5 September 2022, NewSpace India Limited signed a contract with Hindustan Aeronautics Limited and Larsen & Toubro led conglomerate for the production of five PSLV-XL launch vehicles after they won competitive bidding. Under this contract, they have to deliver their first PSLV-XL within 24 months and the remaining four vehicles every six months.

Vehicle description 
The PSLV has four stages, using solid and liquid propulsion systems alternately.

First stage (PS1) 

Pitch and yaw control during first stage flight is provided by the Secondary Injection Thrust Vector Control (SITVC) System, which injects an aqueous solution of strontium perchlorate into the S139 exhaust divergent from a ring of 24 injection ports to produce asymmetric thrust. The solution is stored in two cylindrical aluminium tanks strapped to the core solid rocket motor and pressurised with nitrogen. Underneath these two SITVC tanks, Roll Control Thruster (RCT) modules with small bi-propellant (MMH/MON) liquid engine are also attached.

On the PSLV-G and PSLV-XL, first stage thrust is augmented by six strap-on solid boosters. Four boosters are ground-lit and the remaining two ignite 25 seconds after launch. Two strap-on boosters are equipped with SITVC for additional attitude control. The PSLV-CA uses no strap-on boosters.

First stage separation is aided by four pairs of retro-rockets installed on inter-stage (1/2L). During staging, these eight rockets help push away the spent stage away from second stage.

Second stage (PS2) 

The second stage is powered by a single Vikas engine and carries  of Earth store-able liquid propellantunsymmetrical dimethylhydrazine (UDMH) as fuel and nitrogen tetroxide (N2O4) as oxidiser in two tanks separated by a common bulkhead. The engine is gimbaled (±4°) in two planes to provide pitch and yaw control by two actuators, while roll control is provided by a Hot gas Reaction Control Motor (HRCM) that ejects hot gases diverted from gas generator of Vikas engine.

On inter-stage (1/2U) of PS2  there are two pairs of ullage rockets to maintain positive acceleration during PS1/PS2 staging and also two pairs of retro-rockets to help push away spent stage during PS2/PS3 staging.

Second stage also carries some quantity of water in a toroidal tank at its bottom. Water spray is used to cool hot gases from Vikas' gas generator to about 600 °C before entering turbopump. Propellant and water tanks of second stage are pressurized by Helium.

Third stage (PS3) 

Its burn duration is 113.5 seconds. It has a Kevlar-polyamide fibre case and a submerged nozzle equipped with a flex-bearing-seal gimbaled nozzle with ±2° thrust vector for pitch and yaw control. Roll control is provided by the fourth stage reaction control system (RCS) during thrust phase as well as during combined-coasting phase under which burnt-out PS3 remains attached to PS4.

Fourth stage (PS4) 
The fourth stage is powered by regeneratively cooled twin engines, burning monomethylhydrazine (MMH) and mixed oxides of nitrogen (MON). Each pressure fed engine generates  thrust and is gimbaled (±3°) to provide pitch, yaw and roll control during powered flight. Coast phase attitude control is provided by six 50N RCS thrusters.

On PSLV-C29/TeLEOS-1 mission, the fourth stage demonstrated re-ignition capability for the first time which was used in many subsequent flights to deploy payloads in multiple orbits on a single campaign.

As a space debris mitigation measure, PSLV fourth stage gets passivated by venting pressurant and propellant vapour after achieving main mission objectives. Such passivation prevents any unintentional fragmentation or explosion due to stored internal energy.

PS4 stage as orbital platform 
PS4 has carried hosted payloads like AAM on PSLV-C8, Rubin 9.1/Rubin 9.2 on PSLV-C14 and mRESINS on PSLV-C21. But now, PS4 is being augmented to serve as a long duration orbital platform after completion of primary mission. PS4 Orbital Platform (PS4-OP) will have its own power supply, telemetry package, data storage and attitude control for hosted payloads.

On PSLV-C37 and PSLV-C38 campaigns, as a demonstration PS4 was kept operational and monitored for over ten orbits after delivering spacecraft.

PSLV-C44 was the first campaign where PS4 functioned as independent orbital platform for short duration as there was no on-board power generation capacity. It carried KalamSAT-V2 as a fixed payload, a 1U cubesat by Space Kidz India based on Interorbital Systems kit.

On PSLV-C45 campaign, the fourth stage had its own power generation capability as it was augmented with an array of fixed solar cells around PS4 propellant tank. Three payloads hosted on PS4-OP were, Advanced Retarding Potential Analyzer for Ionospheric Studies (ARIS 101F) by IIST, experimental AIS payload by ISRO and AISAT by Satellize. To function as orbital platform, fourth stage was put in spin-stabilized mode using its RCS thrusters.

On PSLV-C53 campaign the PS4-OP was referred as PSLV Orbital Experimental Module (POEM) and it hosted six payloads. POEM was first PSLV fourth stage based orbital platform to be actively stabilised using Helium based cold gas thrusters after the primary mission and stage passivization.

Payload fairing 

Payload fairing of PSLV, also referred as its "Heatshield" consists of a conical upper section with spherical nose-cap, a cylindrical middle section and a lower boat-tail section. Weighing , it has 3.2 meter diameter and 8.3 meter height. It has Isogrid construction and is made out of 7075 aluminum alloy with a 3 mm thick steel nose-cap. The two halves of fairing are separated using a pyrotechnic device based jettisoning system consisting horizontal and lateral separation mechanisms. To protect spacecraft from damage due to excessive acoustic loads during launch, the heatshield interior is lined with acoustic blankets.

Variants 
ISRO has envisaged a number of variants of PSLV to cater to different mission requirements. There are currently two operational versions of the PSLV — the core-alone (PSLV-CA) without strap-on motors, and the (PSLV-XL) version, with six extended length (XL) strap-on motors carrying 12 tonnes of HTPB based propellant each.

PSLV-G 
The standard or "Generic" version of the PSLV, PSLV-G had four stages using solid and liquid propulsion systems alternately and six strap-on motors (PSOM or S9) with 9 tonne propellant loading. It had capability to launch  to  into sun-synchronous orbit. PSLV-C35 was the last operational launch of PSLV-G before its discontinuation.

PSLV-CA 
The PSLV-CA, CA meaning "Core Alone", model premiered on 23 April 2007. The CA model does not include the six strap-on boosters used by the PSLV standard variant but two SITVC tanks with Roll Control Thruster modules are still attached to the side of the first stage with addition of two cylindrical aerodynamic stabilizers. The fourth stage of the CA variant has  less propellant when compared to its standard version. It currently has capability to launch  to  Sun-synchronous orbit.

PSLV-XL 
PSLV-XL is the upgraded version of Polar Satellite Launch Vehicle in its standard configuration boosted by more powerful, stretched strap-on boosters with 12 tonne propellant load. Weighing  at lift-off, the vehicle uses larger strap-on motors (PSOM-XL or S12) to achieve higher payload capability. On 29 December 2005, ISRO successfully tested the improved version of strap-on booster for the PSLV. The first use of PSLV-XL was the launch of Chandrayaan-1 by PSLV-C11.

PSLV-DL 
PSLV-DL variant has only two strap-on boosters with 12 tonne propellant load on them. PSLV-C44 on 24 January 2019 was the first flight to use PSLV-DL variant of Polar Satellite Launch Vehicle. It is capable of launching  to  Sun-synchronous orbit.

PSLV-QL 

PSLV-QL variant has four ground-lit strap-on boosters, each with 12 tonnes of propellant. PSLV-C45 on 1 April 2019 was the first flight of PSLV-QL. It has the capacity to launch  to  Sun-synchronous orbit.

PSLV-3S (concept) 
PSLV-3S was conceived as a three-staged version of PSLV with its six strap-on boosters and second liquid stage removed. The total lift-off mass of PSLV-3S was expected to be 175 tonnes with capacity to place 500 kg in 550 km low Earth orbit.

Launch Profile 
PSLV - XL:

 The PS1 ignites at T+0 providing 4846 kN of thrust.
 Within T+1, 4 out of the 6 boosters ignite on ground, each producing 703 kN of thrust. 7658kN of total thrust is produced by the combined propulsion of the PSOMs and the PS1.
 At around T+23/26, the remaining 2 unlit boosters are air-lit bringing the rocket at its maximum thrust capacity.
 At T+1:10, the first 4 ground-lit PSOMs have depleted its propellant and now separates and falls down to the  ocean. The remaining 2 PSOMs and the PS1 continue to burn.
 At T+1:35, the remaining 2 PSOMs complete its 70 seconds burn and separate, leaving the rocket in a Core- Alone configuration.
 At T+1:50, the PS1 has completed its 110-second burn and it separates and the Vikas Engine inside the PS2 ignites.
 The second stage burns for around 130 seconds and around T+4 minutes, the second stages shuts off and separates.
 The third stage, which is a solid rocket booster, and burns 80 seconds and then coasts for the remainder of time and around T+8/10 minutes, it separates and the 4th stage ignites to give the rocket a final push into the orbit.
 This 4th stage burn is highly variable and depends on the mass and number of payloads and usually is around 500 seconds long. The 4th stage may shut off around T+16/18 minutes followed by the Payload Deployment.

Launch history 

Launch system status

See also 
 
 GSLV Mark II
 LVM 3
 Comparison of orbital launchers families
 Medium-lift launch vehicle, 2,000 to 20,000 kg to LEO
 Comparison of orbital rocket engines
 Comparison of orbital launch systems

References

External links 

 PSLV : Official ISRO Page
 India in Space PSLV page

 
ISRO space launch vehicles
Vehicles introduced in 1993
Expendable space launch systems